Jonathan Lee Singleton (born September 18, 1991) is an American professional baseball first baseman in the Milwaukee Brewers organization. He has played in Major League Baseball (MLB) for the Houston Astros in 2014 and 2015.

After growing up in Long Beach, California, Singleton was drafted by the Philadelphia Phillies in 2009. He was one of several prospects traded to the Astros in exchange for Hunter Pence in 2011. He signed a $10 million contract with the Astros before making his major league debut in 2014, but he struggled, last playing for the Astros in 2015 before they relegated him to the minor leagues and releasing him in 2018.

Early life
Singleton played baseball at Millikan High School in Long Beach, California. He committed to play at California State University, Long Beach a few months before the 2009 Major League Baseball Draft.

Career

Philadelphia Phillies
The Philadelphia Phillies selected Singleton in the eighth round of the 2009 MLB Draft. He had been projected for selection as high as the second round of the draft, but his senior year statistics caused him to fall a few rounds. Singleton reported to the Gulf Coast League Phillies, where he played 31 minor league games that year. He spent 2010 with the Class A Lakewood BlueClaws, where he hit for a .290 batting average, 14 home runs and 77 runs batted in (RBIs).

Prior to the 2011 season, Singleton was considered the Phillies' second best prospect by Baseball America.

Houston Astros
On July 29, 2011, the Phillies traded Singleton, Jarred Cosart, Josh Zeid, and Domingo Santana to the Houston Astros in exchange for Hunter Pence. Baseball America designated Singleton as Houston's top prospect following the 2011 season. He was named to appear in the 2012 All-Star Futures Game.

Singleton tested positive for marijuana in June 2012. He competed in the Arizona Fall League that offseason, and had a second positive test for marijuana in December. On January 9, 2013, Singleton was suspended for 50 games due to his second failed drug test. Singleton said that he had grown up around friends who used the drug and that he had been using it "on and off" since he was 14 years old. He spent a month in a rehabilitation center after the second failed test.

Following the 2013 season, the Astros added Singleton to their 40 man roster. On June 2, 2014, the Astros signed Singleton to a 5-year contract that guaranteed him $10 million, and could have been worth as much as $35 million. The extension was the first to be signed by a drafted player with no major league experience. Singleton was promoted from the Oklahoma City RedHawks of the Class AAA Pacific Coast League (PCL) to make his major league debut on June 3.

Singleton made his major league debut for the Astros on June 3, 2014 against the Los Angeles Angels of Anaheim. In his first game, he went 1–3 with a home run, two RBIs, a walk, and two strikeouts. His first home run, a solo home run, was off of Matt Shoemaker. On June 8, Singleton lined his first career grand slam off of Glen Perkins of the Minnesota Twins at Target Field to help the Astros to a 14–5 win. Teammates Dexter Fowler, Chris Carter, and George Springer also homered (Carter's was also a grand-slam).

On August 2, 2014, Singleton hit an Inside-the-park home run against the Toronto Blue Jays. It was initially ruled an out by the home plate umpire, but was later reversed following a challenge by Astros manager Bo Porter.

The Astros optioned Singleton to the Fresno Grizzlies of the PCL to start the 2015 season. On May 13, 2015, Singleton recorded 10 RBIs, including a grand slam and two-run home run. His 10 RBIs was one short of the modern day PCL record. Singleton had 22 RBIs in a five-day span, including 18 in Fresno's four game series in Albuquerque from May 12–15, which included two grand slams.

On November 19, 2016, Singleton was placed on outright waivers by the Astros. He cleared waivers on November 22 and was assigned to Fresno. He played the 2017 season with the Corpus Christi Hooks of the Class AA Texas League, and led all minor leaguers with 500 or more plate appearances with a walk percentage of 26.4%.

On May 21, 2018, he was released by the organization while serving a 100 game suspension in the final year of his contract.

Diablos Rojos del México
On April 2, 2020, Singleton signed with the Diablos Rojos del México of the Mexican League. Singleton did not play in a game in 2020 due to the cancellation of the Mexican League because of the COVID-19 pandemic. On November 4, 2020, he was traded to the Guerreros de Oaxaca of the Mexican League. On May 24, 2021, Singleton was traded back to the Diablos Rojos without appearing in a game for the Guerreros. He appeared in 46 games for México in 2021, batting .321/.503/.693 with 15 home runs, 36 RBIs, and four stolen bases.

Milwaukee Brewers
On December 9, 2021, Singleton signed a minor league contract with the Milwaukee Brewers organization. He spent the 2022 season with the Triple-A Nashville Sounds, batting .219/.375/.434 in 456 at-bats, and led minor league baseball with 117 walks, while homering 24 times with 87 RBIs. 

On November 15, 2022, the Brewers selected Singleton to their 40-man roster. On January 23, 2023, Singleton was designated for assignment after the signing of Brian Anderson was made official. He was released by the Brewers on January 26. On February 10, Singleton re-signed with the Brewers on a minor league contract.

References

External links

1991 births
Living people
Houston Astros players
African-American baseball players
Florida Complex League Phillies players
Lakewood BlueClaws players
Clearwater Threshers players
Lancaster JetHawks players
Corpus Christi Hooks players
Liga de Béisbol Profesional Roberto Clemente infielders
Mesa Solar Sox players
Quad Cities River Bandits players
Oklahoma City RedHawks players
Cangrejeros de Santurce (baseball) players
People from Lakewood, California
Baseball players from California
Major League Baseball first basemen
American expatriate baseball players in Mexico
21st-century African-American sportspeople
Millikan High School alumni
Diablos Rojos del México players
Nashville Sounds players